Ongallur may refer to

Ongallur-I, a village in Palakkad district, Kerala, India
Ongallur-II, a village in Palakkad district, Kerala, India
Ongallur (gram panchayat), a gram panchayat serving the above villages